Who the (Bleep)... (stylized as Who the &!*$) is an American documentary television series that airs on Investigation Discovery and premiered on February 1, 2013. It tells the story of those who were deceived by people they never knew had such dark secrets.

Episodes

Season 1 (2013)

Season 2 (2013)

References

2010s American documentary television series
2013 American television series debuts
2013 American television series endings
English-language television shows
Investigation Discovery original programming